Simeti is a surname. Notable people with the surname include:

Mary Taylor Simeti (born 1941), American author
Turi Simeti (1929–2021), Italian painter